The Champions is a British espionage thriller/science fiction/occult detective fiction adventure television series. It was produced by Lew Grade's ITC Entertainment production company, and consists of 30 episodes broadcast in the UK on ITV during 1968–1969. The series was broadcast in the US on NBC, starting in summer 1968.

Plot
Agents Craig Stirling, Sharron Macready and Richard Barrett work for a United Nations law enforcement organization called 'Nemesis', based in Geneva. Barrett is a codebreaker, Stirling a pilot, and Macready a recently widowed scientist and doctor.

In the pilot episode, the team is escaping by air from a spying mission in China.  Their stolen plane, damaged by gunfire during the getaway, crashes in the Himalayas. They are rescued by an advanced civilization living secretly in the mountains of Tibet, who save their lives, granting them enhanced abilities, including extrasensory powers to communicate with one another over distances (telepathy) and to foresee events (precognition), enhanced versions of the ordinary five senses, and intellectual and physical abilities reaching the fullest extent of human capabilities.

Many stories feature unusual villains, such as fascist regimes from unspecified South American countries, Nazis (a common theme of ITC 1960s and 1970s TV, in part owing to both the writers and the domestic audience having been of the war generation) or the Chinese. The villains' schemes often threaten world peace; Nemesis' brief is international, so the agents deal with threats transcending national interests. The main characters have to learn the use of their new powers as they go along, keeping what they discover secret from friend and foe alike. Each episode begins with a close-up shot of a map, showing the region in which the story is to take place, followed by a teaser sometimes prefaced by stock footage; this is followed by the title sequence. Immediately following that is a post-title vignette, in which one or more of the Champions demonstrates exceptional mental or physical abilities, often astonishing or humiliating others. In one example Stirling participates in a sharpshooting contest. In another, Macready's car is blocked in, two laughing passing drunks try to lift it out but she goes round to the other side and pulls it out of the parking space one-handed. Paradoxically, the narration during these often-public demonstrations usually mentions the need to keep the powers a secret. The narration involved in these particular scenes is spoken by American-born actor David Bauer, who also appeared as a foreign-accented villain in the episode "The Experiment".

The only other series regular is the Champions' boss, Tremayne. He does not know that his agents have special abilities, although he does ask innocent questions about just how on their missions they managed to carry out certain tasks about which their reports were vague.

Cast

Main cast
 Stuart Damon as Craig Stirling
 Alexandra Bastedo as Sharron Macready
 William Gaunt as Richard Barrett
 Anthony Nicholls as W.L. Tremayne

Guest cast
 George Murcell as El Gaudillo
 Eric Pohlmann as Barka
 Joseph Furst as Chislenkan
 David Lodge as Filmer
 Ric Young as Burmese Police Captain
 Michael Mellinger as Embassy Official

Production
The Champions was created by Dennis Spooner and its episodes were written by individuals who had worked on other British spy series, including The Avengers and Danger Man. An unfilmed script originally intended for Danger Man was used for one episode.

The series was produced by Monty Berman, who had co-produced The Saint, Gideon's Way and numerous B movies of the 1950s. Berman used many of the same writers, directors and crew on other ITC series, including Department S, Jason King, Randall and Hopkirk (Deceased) and The Adventurer.

Owing to budget constraints, many sets were reused: three episodes were set on a submarine and three in the Arctic. Stock footage was often used. As with other ITC productions, much of the exterior action took place in and around the studio lot – in the case of The Champions, around Associated British Studios in Elstree, England. For at least one episode, "Desert Journey", foreign filming did take place, but with a second unit, and extras standing in for the main cast.

The theme music of the series was written by Tony Hatch, with Albert Elms and Edwin Astley supplying incidental music.

Episodes

Broadcast
The series had three repeat runs in the UK across the ITV regions up to 1976, with additional repeats in September–October 1984 and May–August 1985. It was also regularly repeated on ITV's digital channel ITV4 until January 2011 (making The Saint the remaining ITC property to premiere on ITV4).
The Champions was broadcast on BBC2 in 1995, at about the time when Gaunt was appearing in the sitcom Next of Kin, and it had at least three further repeat runs after that.

On 7 March 2021, the series began a rerun on Talking Pictures TV. The episode 'Desert Journey' was not screened in this run.

From 4 May 2021, the series was being repeated on ITV4. It ended on 15 June, with only 27 of the 30 episodes shown (leaving out ‘Desert Journey’, ‘The Gun Runners’ and ‘Autokill’). It was repeated again on ITV4, later in the year, this time showing 29 out of 30 episodes (yet again, leaving out 'Desert Journey').

Home media
Episodes of this series were released on DVD in North America by A&E Home Entertainment (under licence from Granada International Media Limited) and in the UK, where the full series has been released twice, with the most recent edition seeing Damon, Bastedo and Gaunt reunite to provide a commentary for several episodes. (Damon's role on US series General Hospital meant that Bastedo and Gaunt had to be flown to America for it.)

The series was shown in Italy in the early 1980s in syndication, under the title  (Three Aces) and, more recently, in the 1990s on Canal Jimmy (Sky) but an Italian DVD collection has never been released because in that country The Champions is an almost forgotten show, remembered only by few loyal fans.

In 2010, Network DVD re-released The Champions: The Complete Series as a complete DVD Region 2 box set of all episodes on nine discs (including the rare 'bookends' version of the first episode). (Additionally, it released the music from the series on three CDs.)

Adaptations

Legend of the Champions
In 1983, ITC edited the episodes "The Beginning" and "The Interrogation" into Legend of the Champions, a feature-length film intended for overseas markets.

ITC had released several such films before (notably with The Persuaders!), however in this case the two episodes were not simply joined, but substantially re-edited. "The Interrogation" formed the framing story; its original broadcast form some flashback sequences (mainly from "The Beginning") had been used. These were expanded to contain almost the whole of the earlier episode. Additionally, new credits were filmed, not using any of the original actors but instead their photographs, taken at the time of the original production.

A plot change was the renaming of a character from the original version of "The Beginning" to accommodate a plot device in "The Interrogation". In "The Interrogation", Craig Stirling is ostensibly being quizzed on a character called Julius Retford, who remains unseen. For the film, the opening credits explicitly identify Retford as the character who in "The Beginning" was named Ho Ling (played by Ric Young). This allows the germ warfare theme of "The Beginning" to interlink with the sequences in "The Interrogation". Confusingly, in the end credits Young is credited as playing 'Ho Ling', a name never used in the film version.

This release credited Stuart Damon as the star, with Alexandra Bastedo and William Gaunt receiving co-star credits. This was partly because Damon was a familiar face in U.S. daytime television by this time, and partly because "The Interrogation" is essentially a two-hander between Damon and Colin Blakely, with the rest of the regular cast appearing only briefly.

Legend of the Champions was released on DVD as part of the Network box-set.

Note: 'Bookend' sequences were shot for the first episode "The Beginning" showing Richard Barrett (William Gaunt) recording the story on to a tape recorder in Tremayne's office; this was done so that the episode could be shown out of order on repeat runs without causing any continuity problems. Both sequences were included as extras on the Network DVD box set.

Film
In November 2007, it was reported that Guillermo del Toro would produce and write a film adaptation of The Champions for United Artists. In 2008, Christopher McQuarrie was signed to co-write and co-produce the film. In 2021, it was announced that Ben Stiller would star in and direct a feature film adaptation with Cate Blanchett co-starring. The film will be produced by New Republic Pictures, ITV Studios America and Dirty Films.

Books 
Paperbacks based on the TV series include:
 The Sixth Sense is Death. By John Garforth. London: Hodder Paperbacks, 1969 (a novelisation of the episodes "The Beginning" and "The Experiment")
 Lavage de Cerveau. By Pierre Salva. Paris: Presses de la Cité, 1977

Comic strip
A Champions comic strip ran in City Magazine's Joe 90 Top Secret comic from the first issue (#1, 18 January 1969) until its cancellation with #34 (6 September 1969). They also had a story in the Joe 90 Top Secret Annual 1969.

References

External links 
 
 
 Series entry at BFI screenonline
 Series review at Television Heaven

1960s British drama television series
1968 British television series debuts
1969 British television series endings
1960s British science fiction television series
British superhero television series
British supernatural television shows
Television shows shot at Associated British Studios
Espionage television series
Television series by ITC Entertainment
ITV television dramas
Occult detective fiction